C'est la vie, mon chéri is a 1993 Hong Kong romance film directed by Derek Yee and starring Lau Ching-wan, Anita Yuen and Carina Lau.  It won six awards, including Best Film, during the 13th Hong Kong Film Awards.

Title
The movie is sometimes referred to as C'est la vie, mon chérie even though this is grammatically incorrect in French (either "mon chéri" or "ma chérie" is grammatically correct).  The title may be roughly translated as "That's life, my darling/love".

The original Chinese title refers to the classic 1961 Hong Kong film Love Without End (不了情) starring Lin Dai, with the word "new" (新) added in front of it.  The storyline is similar, in that the female lead character is also diagnosed with a fatal illness.

An alternative English title is Endless Love.

Plot

Min (Anita Yuen), who is part of a Cantonese street opera troupe and a part-time cover artiste, meets Kit (Lau Ching-Wan), a struggling jazz musician who has just broken up with his celebrity singer girlfriend (Carina Lau). Through her bubbly personality, she affects Kit for the better. However, just as their relationship begins to stabilize and win acceptance from Min's family, which includes a strict mother and a doting, saxophone-playing uncle, Min is re-diagnosed with bone cancer, which she had once suffered as a child.

Cast and roles
 Lau Ching-wan as Kit
 Anita Yuen as Min
 Carina Lau as Tracey
 Paul Chun as Uncle / Cheung Po-tsai
 Fung Bo Bo as Min's mother
 Carrie Ng as Yau Ling
 Sylvia Chang as Min's doctor (cameo)
 Jacob Cheung as Fortune teller (cameo)
 David Wu
 Sherman Wong as Producer
 Peter Chan as Cocktail party attendee (cameo)
 Teddy Chan as Man sitting at bar
 Jamie Luk as Blacky
 Eugene Pao as Keung
 Tats Lau as Tats
 Herman Yau as Kit's musician friend
 Andy Chin
 Joe Junior as Cover singer
 Joe Cheung as Bartender
 Lawrence Lau
 Stephen Yip
 Kwai Chung as Mr. Cheung
 Fei Fook
 Cheung Hung-on
 Wong Wa-wo
 Hau Woon-ling
 Alexander Chan 
 Yu Ngai-ho as Music Company Employee
 Chan Kim-wan as musician
 Tsang Cheung
 Cho Sai
 Chin Tsi-ang as Min's granny

Awards and nominations

Theme song
The theme song of the same name C'est la vie, mon chéri is sung by Taiwanese singer One-Fang.

Soundtrack
 One-Fang: 新不了情 "C'est la vie, mon chéri"
 Fung Bo Bo: 念情 "Remembering Love"
 Film score: 晨街 "Morning Street"
 Film score: 憶兒時 "Childhood Memories"
 Lee Fung: 搖紅燭 "Shaking the Red Candle"
 One-Fang: 給我一個吻 "Give Me a Kiss"
 One-Fang: 不了情 "Endless Love"
 Film score: 愛芽初萌 "Shoots of a Budding Love"
 Film score: IN THE MOOD
 Joe Junior, Louise Tang: 載歌載舞（詐肚痛） "Singing and Dancing (Feigning Abdominal Pain)" (Cantonese)
 Lee Fung: 補鑊佬 "Remedial guy" (Cantonese)
 Film score: 返家 "Back Home"
 Fung Bo Bo: 黎明在望 "Dawn Is in Sight" (Cantonese)

Television Series
In 2008, Derek Yee and CCTV produced a television adaptation of C'est la vie, mon chéri, starring Chen Kun, Fiona Sit, Alex Fong, Candice Yu, and Benz Hui.

See also
 List of Hong Kong films

References

External links
 
 HK cinemagic entry
 Review

 

1993 films
1993 romantic drama films
Hong Kong romantic drama films
1990s Cantonese-language films
Best Film HKFA
Films directed by Derek Yee
Films about music and musicians
Films about cancer
Films set in Hong Kong
Films shot in Hong Kong
1990s Hong Kong films